Yagaria is a Papuan language spoken in the Goroka District of Eastern Highlands Province, Papua New Guinea. Named dialects are Kami-Kulaka, Move, Ologuti, Dagenava, Kamate, Hira, Hua (Huva) and Kotom. Yagaria has a total number of 21,116 speakers.

History and culture
The Yagaria people live in low areas about 1,400 meters (4,500 ft.) above sea level with a warm and dry climate around Kami and Gotomi. They practice substance agriculture and live in small hamlets where their population is barely 400 people for each clan. They harvest and plant sweet potatoes, taro, yams, sugarcane, bananas, beans, "pitpit", and different types of spinach. They domesticated pigs, dogs, and chickens. Their diets are usually sweet potatoes, marsupials and birds. When coffee plantations were introduced in the late fifties, cash profit changed most of the Yagaria lifestyle. Now rice, tinned meats and fish, and other food items are easy to find in their stores. Men wear European clothes while most women still wear traditional clothing.

Dialects
Yagaria consists of eight main dialects.

Phonology

Vowels 

 /i/ - Voiced high close unrounded front vocoid occurring word initially, medially, and finally
 /ɛ/ - Voiced mid open unrounded front vocoid gliding to high close unrounded front, occurring word initially, medially, and finally
 // - Voiced mid open unrounded front vocoid gliding to high close unrounded front, occurring word initially, medially, and finally
 /u/ - Voiced high close rounded back vocoid occurring word initially, medially, and finally
 /o/ - Voiced mid close rounded back vocoid occurring word initially, medially, and finally
 // - Voiced mid close rounded back vocoid gliding to high close rounded back, occurring word initially, medially, and finally
 /a/ - Voiced low open unrounded central vocoid occurring word initially, medially, and finally
 // - Voiced unrounded central-front
 // - Voiced central-back

Consonants

Distribution of Phonemes 
The syllable structure used in the Yagaria language is (C)V(ʔ). The four syllable patterns are V, CV, CVʔ, and Vʔ where CV is the most used.

Morphology

Pronouns 
Personal, Possessive, Emphatic, and Interrogative pronouns are used. Personal and Possessive pronouns happens in free word and affixed forms. Emphatic pronoun occurs in suffixes.

Nouns 
The main noun classes used in the Yagaria language are Class 1 and Class 2.

Class 1 
Nouns can indicate living and non-living objects. They occur in two forms, long-form where carrying suffix -na, and short-form where the suffix is removed and ends with a glottal stop. Long-form nouns are used less and mostly for citation, some as a subject, and mostly used in intransitive clauses.

Examples of using Long forms

Long forms as an object:

Short forms as subject in intransitive clause and as an object:

Class 2 
Class 2 nouns have some ending in -na, and is never omitted. Suffixation happens after that syllable.

Examples:

Class 2 nouns that behave somewhat like class 1 nouns. They carry suffix -'na, has short form without ending in a glottal stop. All suffixation occurs with long form carrying the suffix -'na.

Examples:

Adjectives 
Yagaria has a distinction between primary and secondary adjectives. Primary adjectives are used to determine the morphological behavior of "adjectives". Secondary adjectives are obtained from nouns or verbs, or local or temporal expressions occurring as noun adjuncts.

Primary adjectives 
Morphological pattern of class 1 nouns, and class 2 nouns are the two groups being used in the primary adjectives. Most adjectives have short or not-suffixed form for attributive occurrence, and long or suffixed form for predicative occurrence.

Numerals 
Numbers are made using a system of only one, two, and fives. The sum of numbers are usually expressed by hands and feet.

References

Further reading

External links 
 Paradisec has a number of collections that include Yagaria language materials.

Kainantu–Goroka languages
Languages of Eastern Highlands Province